Icichthys is a genus of medusafishes that are native to the eastern Indian Ocean and the northern Pacific Ocean.

Species
There are currently two recognized species in this genus:
 Icichthys australis Haedrich, 1966 (Southern driftfish)
 Icichthys lockingtoni D. S. Jordan & C. H. Gilbert, 1880 (Medusafish)

References

Centrolophidae
Taxa named by David Starr Jordan